Synaptotagmin-5 is a protein that in humans is encoded by the SYT5 gene.

References

Further reading